Agent Cody Banks is a 2003 American spy action comedy film directed by Harald Zwart. The film follows the adventures of the 15-year-old title character, played by Frankie Muniz, who has to finish his chores, avoid getting grounded, and save the world by going undercover for the CIA as a James Bond–type superspy. Hilary Duff, Angie Harmon, Keith David, Cynthia Stevenson, Daniel Roebuck, Darrell Hammond, Ian McShane, and Arnold Vosloo co-star. The movie was filmed in British Columbia and was released in the United States on March 14, 2003.

This film was the first major motion picture project for Duff apart from the film spinoff of her Lizzie McGuire TV series, as well as for Harmon, who had just come off a three-year stint as Assistant D.A. Abbie Carmichael on NBC's Law & Order. A sequel was released the following year. The film's executive producers include Madonna (whose then-production company Maverick Films acquired the script) and Jason Alexander (he was originally attached to direct before being replaced by Vic Armstrong, who was ultimately replaced by Zwart).

Plot
Cody Banks, a 15-year-old bullied high school junior in Seattle, applies for a junior field ops position at the Central Intelligence Agency's Special Activities Division after completing a training summer camp. Answering to his handler Agent Ronica Miles, Cody is called upon a mission to find information about a scientist named Dr. Albert Connors. Connors is employed by a SPECTRE-type organization named ERIS, led by Dr. Brinkman and his henchman François Molay. As every CIA officer is known to Brinkman's organization, the CIA uses the unknown Banks, who is placed into the prep school of Dr. Connors' daughter Natalie, the William Donovan Preparatory Academy.

Cody soon finds he has no social skill with girls and has no time to do this while balancing his chores and homework. The CIA decides to help by doing his chores and homework, trying to build his status, and going into the school to set him up with Natalie. The CIA also assemble a varying team of "experts" to train Cody into how to talk to girls, and issue him with a variety of gadgets with various functions.

Eventually, Cody befriends and falls in love with Natalie after rescuing her from falling off a ladder while putting up a banner, and he is invited to her 16th birthday party, where he goes undercover to her father's lab. Cody finds that Dr. Brinkman is planning to use nanobots — which can destroy any carbon or silicon-based substance — to destroy the world's defense systems so he can threaten anyone who opposes him. Since the nanobots are inactive in the cold, he plans to use ice cubes to distribute them. After Connors, Dr. Brinkman, and François leave the lab, Cody tries to take one of the ice cubes, only for it to melt his shoe when in his possession.

Shortly after this, Cody fights male bullies, at the party. The fight makes the school newspaper, and the CIA suspends Cody from the mission. Meanwhile, with Connors refusing to aid him in his plans, Dr. Brinkman sends François and some men to catch Natalie and bring her into his base in the Cascade Mountains. Meanwhile, disobeying orders to leave her out of it, Cody and Natalie eat ice cream at a restaurant. Cody attempts to explain things to Natalie but François and a group of henchmen come over to their table, beat Cody up, and take Natalie. Cody is fully removed from the mission and is grounded for being missing for hours from his house.

Cody gets his brother Alex to make sure his parents do not find out that he has disappeared by giving him the $5,000 the CIA gave him. Knowing Natalie's location via a tracking device in a necklace he gave her as a birthday present, Cody breaks into the CIA weapons hold and steals a rocket powered snowboard and other devices to rescue Natalie. Cody gets a ride to the top of the mountain and snowboards to the factory where Natalie is held. However, he gets caught in a grove of trees as Ronica finds him using a SoloTrek XFV. After convincing her that they need to rescue Natalie, the pair infiltrate the laboratory and Cody rescues Natalie, also explaining the truth about why he went out with her.

However, the trio are captured by Brinkman's men, although Cody quickly escapes. Natalie is held hostage by Dr. Brinkman, who puts an ice cube with nanobots inside on her forehead to make her father program the system. Cody sets off a series of explosive charges he and Ronica planted throughout the base, and in the ensuing battle, Ronica fights off several of Dr. Brinkman's men, and Natalie kills Dr. Brinkman by placing the ice cube with the nanobots into his mouth, causing it to melt, and the nanobots to devour him from the inside out. Cody later defeats François and sends him to the CIA using the SoloTrek XFV, before fleeing the exploding facility in a helicopter with Ronica, Natalie and Dr. Connors. The CIA welcomes Cody back to the team and congratulates him for completing the mission, and Cody decides to have Natalie earn her drivers license as a reward in which she succeeds in. Then they stop by at a beach cutting Ronica off when she calls. They then kiss starting a relationship.

Cast
 Frankie Muniz as Agent Cody Banks, a 15-year-old teenager who applies for the junior ops division
 Hilary Duff as Natalie Connors, Cody’s girlfriend, a 16-year-old teenager
 Angie Harmon as Veronica "Ronica" Miles, Cody’s supervisor
 Keith David as CIA Director
 Ian McShane as Dr. Brinkman, leader of the ERIS who wants to take over the world
 Arnold Vosloo as François Molay, Dr. Brinkman's right hand man.
 Martin Donovan as Dr. Albert Connors, Natalie's father
 Daniel Roebuck as Mr. Banks, Cody's father
 Cynthia Stevenson as Mrs. Banks, Cody's mother
 Connor Widdows as Alex Banks, Cody's 10-year-old younger brother
 Darrell Hammond as Earl
 Peter New as Rosychuk
 Noel Fisher as Fenster
 Jessica Harmon as Natalie's friend

Production
For his participation in the film, Frankie Muniz was paid $2 million, the highest paid to a child actor at that point since Macaulay Culkin. Agent Cody Banks was developed as part of a broader strategy by MGM to make less-expensive films that can appeal to younger and niche audiences. Both Muniz and Angie Harmon did most of their own stunts for the film. The film used Media.net’s Edit System Dailies to transfer pre-digitized Avid system files from the post production facility Rainmaker in Vancouver directly to the pic’s editing rooms in Los Angeles without having to wait for tapes to be delivered, allowing producers and executives  to receive their viewing copies half a day sooner than through the traditional method.

Reception
The film received generally mixed reviews. On review aggregator Rotten Tomatoes, the film holds a 38% "Rotten" approval rating with an average rating of 5.2/10, based on 104 reviews. The critics consensus states, "Should satisfy young teens, but offers nothing new for those who are familiar with the formula." On Metacritic, the film has a score of 41 out of 100 based on reviews from 24 critics, indicating "mixed or average reviews". Audiences polled by CinemaScore gave the film an average grade of "A-" on an A+ to F scale.

Agent Cody Banks opened at #2 with $14,064,317 behind Bringing Down the Houses second weekend. By the time the film closed on July 31, 2003, the film had earned $47,938,330 domestically and an additional $10,857,484 internationally, adding up to a total $58,795,814.

Controversy
When the film was released on home video, MGM included an apologetic paragraph in response to a throwaway line involving "Special ed". The furor erupted over an almost throwaway line in the film, at the end of the testy first meeting between the film’s protagonist, played by Frankie Muniz, and his love interest, played by Hilary Duff. After Muniz’s character stumbles through several inane questions, Duff’s character barks, “Are you in special ed?” and stomps off.

Sequel

Muniz reprised his title role in the sequel, Agent Cody Banks 2: Destination London, was released on March 12, 2004. Duff and Angie Harmon were replaced by different characters played by Anthony Anderson and Hannah Spearritt.

References

External links
 
 
 

2003 films
2003 action comedy films
2003 romantic comedy films
2000s adventure comedy films
2000s English-language films
2000s spy comedy films
2000s teen comedy films
2000s teen romance films
20th Century Fox films
American action comedy films
American adventure comedy films
American romantic comedy films
American spy comedy films
American teen comedy films
American teen romance films
Films about the Central Intelligence Agency
Films directed by Harald Zwart
Films scored by John Powell
Films set in Russia
Films set in Seattle
Films set in Washington (state)
Films with screenplays by Ashley Edward Miller and Zack Stentz
Films with screenplays by Scott Alexander and Larry Karaszewski
Metro-Goldwyn-Mayer films
Teen action films
Teen adventure films
2000s American films